Highway 722 is a highway in the Canadian province of Saskatchewan. It runs from Highway 37 near Shaunavon to Highway 4.

This road is known locally as "The Little Six". It was nicknamed this as the westernmost six miles near Shaunavon are paved.

See also 
Roads in Saskatchewan
Transportation in Saskatchewan

References 

722